St Edmund's is a Roman Catholic primary school for boys and girls aged 4–11 located on the junction where the Hertford Road meets Bounces Road in Edmonton, north London, United Kingdom. The school was built in 1912.

The Most Precious Blood and St Edmund Catholic Church
The church is directly opposite the school and finished in the same white coursed stone. Built between 1905 and 1907 by Edward Doran Webb and founded in 1903 by Redemptorist priests.

References 

Educational institutions established in 1912
Primary schools in the London Borough of Enfield
Catholic primary schools in the Archdiocese of Westminster
1912 establishments in England
Voluntary aided schools in London
Edmonton, London